Scaredy Squirrel is a Canadian animated comedy television series based very loosely on the book series of the same name by Mélanie Watt for YTV and Cartoon Network. The series follows the wisecracking adventures of an orange squirrel named Scaredy and his best friend Dave, a anthropomorphic blue and white skunk. It was produced by Nelvana, in association with YTV,  with additional production facilities provided by Studio 306, Pipeline Studios Inc. and Super Sonics Productions Inc., with Dolby Digital doing the sound, with Writers Guild of Canada and ACTRA writing the show's renewal plates, with the series' funding provided by The Canada Media Fund and The Canadian Film or Video Production Tax Credit. The series premiered on YTV in Canada on April 1, 2011, and on Cartoon Network in the United States on August 9, 2011. It ended on YTV in Canada on August 17, 2013, and in the United States on September 17, 2014.

Series overview
{| class="wikitable plainrowheaders" style="text-align:center;"
|+ Scaredy Squirrel series overview
|-
!scope="col" colspan="2" rowspan="2"|Season
!scope="col" rowspan="2"|Episodes
!scope="col" colspan="4"|Originally aired
|-
!scope="col"|First aired (Canada)
!scope="col"|Last aired (Canada)
!scope="col"|First aired (U.S.)
!scope="col"|Last aired (U.S.)
|-
|scope="row" style="background:#80bfff;"|
|1
|26
|
|
|
|
|-
|scope="row" style="background:#3A5673;"|
|2
|14
|
|
|
|
|-
|scope="row" style="background:#80ffbf;"|
|3
|12
|
|
|
|
|}

Episodes

Season 1 (2011)

</onlyinclude>

Season 2 (2012–13)

Season 3 (2013)

References

Scaredy Squirrel